André Luiz Moreira (born 14 November 1974 in São Paulo), known as just André Luiz, is a Brazilian former footballer who most recently played as an attacking midfielder for San Jose Earthquakes in Major League Soccer.

Career

Club
André Luiz began his career in 1993, and played in Brazil for clubs including São Paulo, Corinthians, Cruzeiro, Fluminense. He relocated to Europe 2001 and subsequently played in Spain for Tenerife, and in France for Olympique de Marseille, Paris Saint-Germain FC and AC Ajaccio.

He won the CONMEBOL Supercup, Copa Libertadores and Intercontinental Cup in 1993, two Recopa in 1993 and 1994, and São Paulo State Championship in 1997.

André Luiz signed with San Jose Earthquakes of Major League Soccer on 31 July 2009. He stayed with the club through the 2011 season. In 2012, he finished his career as a soccer player because a knee injury.

Andre Luiz is currently head coach of San Jose Earthquakes u14/academy.

International
André Luiz has played 19 matches and scored two goals for the Brazilian team. He won bronze medal at 1996 Summer Olympics.

References

External links
 
 
 
 

1974 births
Living people
Brazilian footballers
São Paulo FC players
Sport Club Corinthians Paulista players
Brazilian expatriate footballers
Brazilian expatriate sportspeople in Spain
Brazil international footballers
Olympic footballers of Brazil
Footballers at the 1996 Summer Olympics
Olympic bronze medalists for Brazil
Fluminense FC players
Santos FC players
Olympique de Marseille players
Paris Saint-Germain F.C. players
CD Tenerife players
Cruzeiro Esporte Clube players
AC Ajaccio players
Liga MX players
Chiapas F.C. footballers
San Jose Earthquakes players
Ligue 1 players
Major League Soccer players
Expatriate footballers in Mexico
Expatriate footballers in France
Expatriate footballers in Spain
Expatriate soccer players in the United States
Olympic medalists in football
San Jose Earthquakes non-playing staff
Medalists at the 1996 Summer Olympics
Association football midfielders
1996 CONCACAF Gold Cup players
Footballers from São Paulo